Sud Obelisk is a public artwork in Douala, Cameroon, created by Faouzi Laatiris. The work is an engraved obelisk.

Description 
The artwork is an obelisk, which appears directly from the ground without basing. Realized in reinforced concrete, it is covered with black marble, and covered with golden brass. On one side, names of the city and other places in the world are engraved in Latin characters and Arabic calligraphy, which are endowed with obelisks and are reference places of art.

The obelisk, belonging to the vocabulary of classical Egyptian architecture, is the most elaborate shape of universal rites of raised stones. Such monuments, of classic, modern or contemporary periods decorate most of the Western and African metropolises today. Sud Obelisk, also makes reference to the burial, which as a rite is an integral part of Cameroonian life.

Sud Obelisk was inaugurated during the Salon Urbain de Douala - SUD 2007.

See also 
 List of public art in Douala
 Contemporary African art

References

Bibliography 

 Pensa, Iolanda (Ed.) 2017. Public Art in Africa. Art et transformations urbaines à Douala /// Art and Urban Transformations in Douala. Genève: Metis Presses. 
 Verschuren, K., X. Nibbeling and L. Grandin. (2012): Making Douala 2007-2103, Rotterdam, ICU art project
 Marta Pucciarelli (2014) Final Report. University of Applied Sciences and Arts of Southern Switzerland, Laboratory of visual culture. 

Culture in Douala
Public art in Douala